Félix Auger-Aliassime defeated Sebastian Korda in the final, 6–3, 6–4 to win the singles tennis title at the 2022 European Open. It was his second title in as many weeks and third career ATP Tour singles title overall.

Jannik Sinner was the reigning champion, but did not participate this year.

Seeds
The top four seeds receive a bye into the second round.

Draw

Finals

Top half

Bottom half

Qualifying

Seeds

Qualifiers

Lucky losers

Qualifying draw

First qualifier

Second qualifier

Third qualifier

Fourth qualifier

References

External links
 Main draw
 Qualifying draw

European Open – Singles
2022 Singles